Tom Leek (born August 6, 1968) is an American politician who has served in the Florida House of Representatives from the 25th district since 2016. After re-districting, Leek is now running in Florida's 28th district hoping for a leadership position in his final term.

References

1968 births
Living people
Republican Party members of the Florida House of Representatives
21st-century American politicians